The Ford Falcon (XR) is a full-sized car produced by Ford Australia from 1966 to 1968. It was the first of the second generation of the Falcon and also included the Ford Fairmont (XR), the luxury-oriented version.

Overview
The XR series was introduced in September 1966. Styling was based on the third-generation 1966 US Ford Falcon, and it was promoted as the "Mustang-bred Falcon". The XR marked the first time a V8 engine could be optioned in all trim levels of an Australian car, V8s having previously been reserved for the more upmarket variants. The 144 cubic inch (2.4 L) six-cylinder engine was deleted for the XR series, leaving the 170 cubic inch (2.8 L) six as the base Falcon engine. A 200 cubic inch (3.3 L) six was also available and a 200ci super pursuit motor.

The XR series was initially offered in 9 different models: Falcon, Falcon 500, and Fairmont sedans, Falcon, Falcon 500, and Fairmont wagons, Falcon and Falcon 500 utilities, and the Falcon Van. The new wagons shared the  wheelbase with the XR sedans, unlike the 1966 US Falcon wagons which featured a  wheelbase. The Falcon 500 replaced the Falcon Deluxe of the XP series and the two-door hardtop body style available in the XP series was not offered in the XR range.

The Falcon XR won the Wheels Car of the Year award in 1966, giving Ford Falcon two straight wins.

Falcon GT

The marketing focus on the Falcon's relationship with the Mustang's sporty appeal led to Ford introducing a Falcon GT variant of the XR in 1967, featuring a  version of the 289 cubic inch (4.7 L) Windsor V8 engine, sourced from the Ford Mustang. The GT heralded the dawn of the Aussie muscle car. All of the original XR GTs were painted in the colour GT Gold, except for eight that were Gallaher Silver and another five that were Russet Bronze, Sultan Maroon, Polar White, Avis White and Ivy Green. The non-gold GTs, while having the same specifications, are the rarest of the early Australian muscle cars.

Motorsport

Ford Works Team manager/driver Harry Firth, and a young Fred Gibson won the 1967 Gallaher 500 at the Mount Panorama Circuit in Bathurst driving an XR Falcon GT. Firth and Gibson won the race by 11 seconds from their Sydney-based teammates Ian and Leo Geoghegan. The Geoghegan Falcon was initially flagged in first, but a protest from Firth resulted in a recount of laps and the win being awarded to Firth and Gibson.

With the Falcon powered by a 289-cubic-inch Ford V8 engine, it was the first ever Bathurst 500/1000 won by a V8-powered car. Prior to 1967, the Mount Panorama Circuit had been regarded as too tough on the larger V8 cars (primarily the Studebaker Lark), and had been the domain of smaller cars such as the Morris Cooper S and Ford's own Cortina GT500.

References

XR
Cars of Australia
Cars introduced in 1966
Cars discontinued in 1968
XR Falcon
Sedans
Station wagons
Coupé utilities
Vans
Rear-wheel-drive vehicles